Rehna is an Amt in the district of Nordwestmecklenburg, in Mecklenburg-Vorpommern, Germany. The seat of the Amt is in Rehna.

The Amt Rehna consists of the following municipalities:

References

Ämter in Mecklenburg-Western Pomerania